Two ships of the Royal Navy have borne the name HMS Caledon:

  was a 16-gun sloop, previously the French ship Henri.  She was captured from the French in 1808 and sold in 1811.
  was a  light cruiser launched in 1916.  She was converted into an anti-aircraft ship in 1943 and was sold for scrapping in 1948.

See also
 Ships named 

Royal Navy ship names